A Hoberman sphere is an isokinetic structure patented by Chuck Hoberman that resembles a geodesic dome, but is capable of folding down to a fraction of its normal size by the scissor-like action of its joints.

Description
A Hoberman sphere typically consists of six great circles corresponding to the edges of an icosidodecahedron.  The Hoberman sphere can be unfolded by allowing certain members to spread apart.  The operation of each joint is linked to all the others in a scissors mechanism like those used to mount pantograph mirrors, or how a folding chair operates.  In larger models, this can be accomplished by feeding out a string or cable instead.

The largest existing Hoberman sphere is in the AHHAA Science Center in Tartu, Estonia. The motorized sphere weighs , is constructed of aircraft-grade aluminum, and continually oscillates between its compact and expanded states. The sphere is suspended above the Center's Science Court and is actuated with a computer-based motion control system. This system opens and closes the sphere in a programmed series of lyrical motions choreographed to music, lighting and special effects.

An earlier, similar but slightly smaller Hoberman sphere is in the atrium of Liberty Science Center in Jersey City, New Jersey. The  sphere, when fully expanded, measures  in diameter.

In 1993 a smaller geodesic sphere was installed at the Swiss Science Center Technorama in Winterthur, Switzerland.

See also
Hoberman mechanism

References

Further reading
 Greg Lynn (2014), Expanding sphere, Canadian Centre for Architecture

External links 
 Hoberman.com - Welcome to the World of Magical Transformation
 "Radial expansion/retraction truss structures". Google Patents
 how to make a K'nex Hoberman sphere
 How to make a popsicle Hoberman sphere

Linkages (mechanical)
Polyhedra
Educational toys